Dagblad Suriname is one of the leading daily Surinamese newspapers. It is published in the Dutch language in Paramaribo. Dagblad was founded in 2002, and is part of FaFam Publishing N.V. The newspaper has been described as centre left.

References

External links

 

Newspapers published in Suriname
Dutch-language newspapers published in South America
Publications with year of establishment missing
Newspapers established in 2002
2002 establishments in Suriname
Companies of Suriname